, born in December 7, 1991, is a Japanese actor and singer. He is best known for his role as Ryoma Echizen as part of the third generation Seigaku cast in The Prince of Tennis musicals, Tenimyu.

Biography

Career 
Dori Sakurada was born in December 7, 1991 in Tokyo, Japan.  At age 11, while walking home with his Mother, he was scouted and soon joined his current company, Amuse. He took singing, dancing and acting lessons while attending middle and high school. In 2005, he was chosen to play the lead protagonist Ryoma Echizen in a musical adapted from the popular anime The Prince of Tennis, Tenimyu. The desicion generated a buzz, as at the age of 14, he was the youngest member to be cast. In the same year, he made his acting debut when he appeared in one episode of the TV drama, Ruri's Island. After his two year run as Ryoma Echizen, he got his big break in 2008 when he starred as Kotaro Nogami in Saraba Kamen Rider Den-O: Final Countdown, the third film adaptation of the popular Kamen Rider Series. The film was a success, ranking second on its opening week and earning a total of ¥720 million in the Japanese box office.

In 2013, went on hiatus to study in London, England. In a 2019 interview, he revealed that the decision came from the want to explore other career options, as he was slowly losing the passion and motivation, the path of acting not being his choice in the first place. However, he returned to Japan in just 6 months. He admitted his time away immediately changed his attitude towards work, renewed his hunger to succeed in the entertainment industry and that this time, it was his choice to be an actor. Since then, he has appeared in films such as Orange (2015) and Let Me Eat Your Panceas (2017), and in TV shows such as Scum's Wish (2017), Coffee & Vanilla (2019) and Alice in Borderland (2020).

Apart from acting, he writes and produces his own music, releasing his first EP, Sakura da Festa BEST, in 2019. He performs live in his yearly fan event, Sakura da Festa, the first one held in 2016.

In 2020, he established his official fanclub, the Sakura da Space Society.

In 2022, he completed his first Zepp tour. Named Dori Sakurada ZEPP TOUR 2022: Anniversary to the next level, he performed in Tokyo, Osaka, Nagoya and Yokohama.

Personal life 
Named after Sakurada-dori Avenue in Tokyo, Dori has an older brother, older sister, and a younger sister. He attended Meguro Nihon University High School, where he often played tennis and basketball. In 2002, the same year he was scouted, he got a Dachshund which he named Fanta. After his pet's death in 2019, he centered his fanclub website theme and design around Fanta, along with his interest in outer space.

His favorite musician is the Japanese rock band, UVERworld. After meeting the band's lead vocalist TAKUYA∞ in one of his singing lessons, he became a fan, immediately buying all of their CDs on his way home. Since then, they've become close friends, with Dori often seen wearing a gold ring that was gifted to him by TAKUYA∞ for his 18th birthday, and UVERworld providing the theme song for Dori's 2014 movie, Marching: Ashita e.

He is close friends with Kento Yamazaki. The duo met on the set of Baseball Brainiacs (2014), and have worked in multiple movies and shows since. In the variety program The World's Ashtonishing News!, Kento revealed that him, Dori and both their mothers celebrated New year's day 2020 by going on a trip to Hakone, Japan. He is also close friends with former Amuse artists Takeru Satoh and Ryunosuke Kamiki.

Stages and Musicals

Filmography

Television

Films

Music Video Appearances
 Winter Love Story – JYONGRI (2008)
 Ame ni Utaeba – monobright (2010)
 Gingham Check – AKB48 (2012)
 I Still Love You – Lisa Halim (2012)
 Tsubasa wa Iranai – AKB48 (2016)
 Aoi Signal - MAGIC OF LiFE (2016)
 Kumu wo Nuketa Aozora - Da-iCE (2019)

Animation
 Scum's Wish (Fuji TV, 2017) as Ori Kurada

Discography

Extended Plays

Singles

Other participating works

Bibliography

Photobooks 
 20th Anniversary limited edition DORIBLOG (November 2011, Amuse) ISBN 4943566222621
 Dori Sakurada first photo book "Sakurada" (June 2014, Wani Books) ISBN 9784847046506
 Sakura da Festa 2016～Music for my friends～ CD＆Photobook (July 2016, Amuse) 
 "Shiro to Ito" Photobook collaboration (August 2016, Amuse) 
 Sakura da Festa 2017 ~Wonderful Encounter~ CD & Photobook (July 2017, Amuse) 
 Sakura da Festa Birthday Tour CD & Photobook (June 2018, Amuse) 
 GOOD ROCKS! Vol.102 (August 2019, Amuse) ISBN 9784401762705
 Dori Sakurada second photo book "The 27 Club" (December 2019, Amuse) ISBN 9784909852045
 Dori Sakurada ZEPP TOUR 2022 "Anniversary to the next level" Live Blu-ray & Photobook (July 2022, Amuse)

CM 
 P&G "Lumines" (2006)
 UNIQLO "Christmas for that person: Print fleece" (2007)
 Fujifilm "Fujicolor: New Year's postcard ~Mr. Okubo's hobby" (2013)
 Sankei Shimbun "Sankei Express" (2013)
 Tokyo One Piece Tower "Point of View" (2015)
 WonderPlanet's Crash Fever "Disgusting Boss: Read Through" (2016)
 WonderPlanet's Crash Fever "Disgusting Boss: Nyan Nyan" (2016)
 Danone Japan OIKOS greek yoghurt "Jaw Kui" (2017) 
 Isehan "Heroine Make Volume Control Mascara" (2018)
 Adidas "Training Athletic 2020SS" (2020) 
 Pokémon "Family Pokémon card game: Sword and Shield" (2021)
 Pokémon "Family Pokémon card game: Start Deck 100" (2021)
 Yves Rocher "Au Fresh Fragrance: My Vanilla Garden" (2021)
 Smooth Skin "Smooth Skin Bare Smart" (2021)

References

External links 
 Official Amuse Profile 
 Dori's Personal Blog 
 Official fanclub - Sakura da Space Society (in Japanese)
 Instagram profile
 Twitter profile
 Youtube channel

1991 births
Living people
21st-century Japanese male actors
Amuse Inc. talents
21st-century Japanese singers
21st-century Japanese male singers